Mount Chual is a prominent peak in the Santa Cruz Mountains in southwest Santa Clara County, California, United States. It is the third highest peak in the Santa Cruz Mountains. Several tributaries to Llagas Creek originate on the southern and eastern flanks of the peak.

History 
The name of the mountain first appeared on a Mexican-era map of New Almaden in 1848 as Picacho de Chual.   is a Mexican Spanish word for goosefoot (Chenopodium album), derived from Nahuatl .

The summit has a radio communications facility, operating since 1965.  The peak and surrounding land is currently owned by the Santa Clara Valley Open Space Authority.

See also 
 List of summits of the San Francisco Bay Area

References

External links
 

Mountains of Santa Clara County, California
Mountains of the San Francisco Bay Area
Mountains of Northern California